Narran may refer to:
 Acacia victoriae
 Narran, Iran